A backstuga (literally "slope cottage") is a  Swedish language judicial term, previously used in Finland and Sweden, for a kind of rural cottage.

Additionally, in architecture, a backstuga is a cottage built into the southern slope of a hill, alternatively with a low floor and its walls stretched halfway down into the ground. Such cottages are also referred to as jordstuga (earth cottage) or stenstuga (stone cottage). In the 20th century, the general poverty was mitigated and this kind of homes became less and less used.

In administrative respect, the legal meaning is a rural home with no land to farm that was built on someone else's property and without an own entry in the land registry. Its dwellers were called backstugusittare (slope cottage sitters) with a connotation of pauper. This phenomenon is known from the early 1600s and was disliked by the government seeing it as a way to evade taxes. The house may have been owned by the head of the family living there, but taxes were the responsibility of the land owner. Such cottages were typically raised on land useless for farming. Also the common land of the village, or that of the parish, were usual spots.

A backstuga in this judicial meaning may have been inhabited by craftsmen, and not necessarily small, or by those of the peasantry not active in the productive life of the community, such as old people who could no longer work, retired servants and the community destitute who had no relatives to care for them. In practice, although legally forbidden until 1846, a parish may have offered to pay for a backstuga-dwelling to a pauper instead of offering a place in a poor house, that all parishes didn't care to organize. The legal alternative, called rotegång, was to let the poor wander from farm to farm, following a strict scheme staying one or a few days at each. But its popularity waned.

Technically, also a farmer whose farm was taken over by a son or a son-in-law, was registered as housed either by the son or in a backstuga. But here the word is used in the population registry and in a statistical context. In church records, the term is undantagsman (or undantagsänka for a widow), which contrary to backstugusittare do not confer any social stigma.

See also
 Torp (architecture)

References

Other sources
 Svensk uppslagsbok
 Nils-Arvid Bringéus: Arbete och redskap kap. 11. Byggnadsskick

Building
History of agriculture
Social history of Finland
Social history of Sweden